The band-backed wren (Campylorhynchus zonatus) is a small songbird of the wren family.

The band-backed wren is a resident breeding species from south-central Gulf Coast Mexico to northwestern Ecuador. It occurs in five disjunct areas, the central region being in southern Central America, in Costa Rica and northern Panama. The next two regions are northern Colombia adjacent to Panama, and 800 km to the south in northwestern Ecuador.

Description
This large wren breeds in lowlands and foothills from sea level up to 1700 m altitude in thinned forest or open woodland, scrub, second growth and groves around houses. It mainly occurs on the Caribbean side of the Central American mountain ranges.  Its large spherical nest has a wide side entrance and is constructed 2 – 30 m high in a tree or shrub, often hidden amidst bromeliads. The female alone incubates the three to five unmarked or lightly brown-spotted white eggs for about two weeks to hatching, and the young fledge in about the same length of time again. After breeding, families sleep together in dormitory nests like those used for breeding throughout the year.

The adult band-backed wren is 16.5 cm long and weighs 29 g. It has a brown-grey crown, black nape, and the rest of the upperparts and tail are heavily barred with black, tawny and white. The breast and throat are white, heavily spotted with black, and the belly is cinnamon. Young birds have duller upperparts and off-white to buff underparts.

This species has a short rasping zek call. The song is a mix of dry chatters, splutters and gurgles.
 
The band-backed wren forages actively in family groups of 4-12 birds. It eats mainly insects, spiders and other invertebrates.

References

 Stiles and Skutch,  A guide to the birds of Costa Rica

Further reading

External links
Band-backed Wren videos on the Internet Bird Collection
Band-backed Wren photo gallery VIREO Photo-High Res

Campylorhynchus
Birds of Mexico
Birds of Central America

Birds of Guatemala
Birds of El Salvador
Birds of Honduras
Birds of Nicaragua
Birds of Costa Rica
Birds of Panama
Birds of Colombia
Birds of Ecuador
Birds described in 1832
Taxa named by René Lesson